A List of Czech films of the 1950s.

References

1950s
Czech
Films